The F. Morris Touchstone Award is an award given by the United States Intercollegiate Lacrosse Association to the nation's most outstanding NCAA Division I lacrosse head coach.  The award was first presented in 1958.

The award is named after F. Morris Touchstone who was head coach at the United States Military Academy from 1928 to 1957.  While at Army, his teams had a record of 214-73-4. Of Army's 82 first-team All-Americans, 42 played under Touchstone. and won the national championship in 1944, 1945 (co-winner with Navy), and 1951 (co-winner with Princeton).  Touchstone was inducted in the U.S. Lacrosse Hall of Fame in 1960.

Award winners

By individual

By University

References								

College lacrosse trophies and awards in the United States